Zsolt Gévay (born 19 November 1987) is a Hungarian professional footballer who plays for Paks, as a defender.

Club statistics

Updated to games played as of 15 May 2021.

References

Paksi FC Official Website
HLSZ

1984 births
Living people
Sportspeople from Dunaújváros
Hungarian footballers
Association football defenders
Fehérvár FC players
Makó FC footballers
Paksi FC players
Gyirmót FC Győr players
Mezőkövesdi SE footballers
Nemzeti Bajnokság I players